Lodi School Hillside Improvement Site, also known as Veterans Memorial Park, is a former public works project listed on the National Register of Historic Places. The site consists of two parcels located on Corner Street, between Pleasant Street and Columbus Street in Lodi, Wisconsin, United States.

History
The stone retaining walls and stairways of the hillside below Lodi Primary School were a public works project from 1933 to 1938. The site was designed by the first professor of landscape architecture at the University of Wisconsin, Franz A. Aust. On the opposite side of a creek that separates the two parcels of land, Veteran's Memorial Park was completed in 1948. The site was added to the National Register of Historic Places on April 9, 2009. It was the featured listing in the National Park Service's weekly list of April 17, 2009.

References

New Deal in Wisconsin
Parks on the National Register of Historic Places in Wisconsin
Protected areas of Columbia County, Wisconsin
Lodi, Wisconsin
National Register of Historic Places in Columbia County, Wisconsin